The HTC Desire 310 is an Android-based smartphone designed and manufactured by HTC. The dual-SIM phone is powered by 1.3 GHz quad-core processor, and has a 4.5-inch screen. The Desire 310 is an entry-level smartphone running Android 4.2 Jelly Bean. The phone features a 1.3 GHz quad-core processor and 1 GB RAM.

See also

 HTC Desire 610
 HTC Desire 816

References

Android (operating system) devices
Desire 310
Mobile phones introduced in 2014
Discontinued smartphones
Mobile phones with user-replaceable battery